Jordan Lewis Tucker (born April 3, 1998) is an American professional basketball player for BC Chernomorets of the Bulgarian National Basketball League. He played college basketball for the Duke Blue Devils and the Butler Bulldogs.

Early life and high school career
Tucker began his high school career at White Plains High School. On December 28, 2013, he scored 34 points in a 74–48 win against Cardinal Spellman High School. Tucker transferred to Archbishop Stepinac High School for his sophomore season and averaged 15.6 points per game. He averaged 17.8 points, 9.8 rebounds, and 2.8 assists per game as a junior, earning Second Team All-League honors. For his senior season, Tucker transferred to Wheeler High School in Georgia, reuniting with his friend Darius Perry. A four-star recruit, he committed to playing college basketball for Duke in May 2017 over offers from Syracuse, Georgia Tech, Oregon, Villanova and Indiana.

College career
Tucker found minimal playing time at Duke, scoring six points in two games. He opted to transfer to Butler after the first semester, choosing the Bulldogs over Georgetown. Tucker became eligible for Butler in December 2018. On January 19, 2019, he scored a career-high 24 points in an 80–71 win against St. John's. He averaged 9.7 points and 4.1 rebounds per game as a sophomore. Tucker focused on improving his shooting during his junior season. As a junior, Tucker averaged 8.9 points and 3.8 rebounds per game, shooting 36 percent from three-point range. Following the season, he declared for the 2020 NBA draft.

Professional career

Windy City Bulls (2021–2022)
In October 2021, Tucker joined the Windy City Bulls after a successful tryout. Tucker was then later waived on January 17, 2022. In nine games, he averaged 3.9 points and 3.0 rebounds per game.

Rio Grande Valley Vipers (2022)
On January 25, 2022, Tucker was added to the roster of the Rio Grande Valley Vipers. He was waived on January 31.

Sioux Falls Skyforce (2022)
On March 24, 2022, Tucker was acquired via available player pool by the Sioux Falls Skyforce.

KK Feniks 2010 (2022–2023)
On November 26, 2022, Tucker signed with KK Feniks 2010 of the Macedonian First League. In five games, he averaged 16.4 points, 5.4 rebounds, and one assist per game.

BC Chernomorets (2023–present)
On January 15, 2023, Tucker joined BC Chernomorets of the Bulgarian National Basketball League.

Career statistics

College

|-
| style="text-align:left;"| 2017–18
| style="text-align:left;"| Duke
| 2 || 0 || 7.0 || .500 || .500 || .500 || .5 || .0 || .0 || .0 || 3.0
|-
| style="text-align:left;"| 2018–19
| style="text-align:left;"| Butler
| 24 || 9 || 22.2 || .358 || .370 || .826 || 4.1 || .8 || .5 || .1 || 9.7
|-
| style="text-align:left;"| 2019–20
| style="text-align:left;"| Butler
| 30 || 5 || 22.7 || .357 || .357 || .791 || 3.8 || .7 || .3 || .2 || 8.9
|- class="sortbottom"
| style="text-align:center;" colspan="2"| Career
| 56 || 14 || 21.9 || .359 || .364 || .800 || 3.8 || .7 || .3 || .1 || 9.0

Personal life
Tucker is the son of Lewis Tucker and Lori Land. Lewis Tucker played basketball at Tuskegee University and earned his degree in finance. The elder Tucker served as president of recording artist P. Diddy’s Sean Combs Enterprises before becoming a sports agent representing Ben Gordon and C. J. Miles. Tucker’s godfather is the late rapper Heavy D.

References

External links
Butler Bulldogs bio

1998 births
Living people
American men's basketball players
American expatriate basketball people in Bulgaria
American expatriate basketball people in North Macedonia
Basketball players from New York (state)
Butler Bulldogs men's basketball players
Duke Blue Devils men's basketball players
People from White Plains, New York
Small forwards
Windy City Bulls players